Brian Connelly (born June 10, 1986) is an American professional ice hockey defenseman currently contracted to EHC Lustenau of the Alps Hockey League (AlpsHL). Connelly previously iced with the Nottingham Panthers of the Elite Ice Hockey League (EIHL).

Playing career
Connelly played collegiate hockey with Colorado College of the WCHA as a puck-moving offensive defenseman.

Undrafted due to his diminutive size, Connelly signed a contract with the Chicago Blackhawks of the NHL. In his first seasons with the Blackhawks affiliate, the Rockford IceHogs, Connelly quickly developed as the main scoring presence on the IceHogs defense. In the 2010–11 season, Connelly was selected and played in the 2011 AHL All-Star Game.

In the following 2011–12 season, in the midst of his third full season within the Blackhawks system and following his second consecutive AHL All-Star Game appearance, Connelly was traded to the Calgary Flames in exchange for veteran Brendan Morrison on February 27, 2012. He was then immediately assigned to the Flames' AHL affiliate, the Abbotsford Heat. In helping the Heat to the second round of the playoffs, Connelly finished with a combined 52 points, placing second in the AHL amongst defenseman to earn a position in the AHL Second All-Star Team.

On July 6, 2012, Connelly signed as a free agent to a two-year, two-way contract with the Minnesota Wild.

In the final year of his contract in the 2013–14 season, on February 26, 2014, Connelly was traded by the Wild in a return to the Chicago Blackhawks in exchange for Brad Winchester.

On July 11, 2014, Connelly signed as a free agent to a one-year contract with Leksands IF of the Swedish Hockey League. He endured a disappointing debut European season in 2014–15 with Leksands, contributing with only 2 goals and 12 points in 48 games.

In hopes of a rebound, Connelly left Leksands to sign a one-year contract with Austrian club Champions, EC Red Bull Salzburg of the Austrian Hockey League (EBEL) on May 29, 2015.

Connelly played four seasons in the EBEL before leaving as a free agent to sign a one-year deal with English club, the Nottingham Panthers of the EIHL, on June 18, 2019.

On June 24, 2020, Connelly left Nottingham to sign for AlpsHL side EHC Lustenau.

Career statistics

References

External links

1986 births
Abbotsford Heat players
American men's ice hockey defensemen
Living people
Colorado College Tigers men's ice hockey players
Dornbirn Bulldogs players
Houston Aeros (1994–2013) players
Ice hockey players from Minnesota
Iowa Wild players
Leksands IF players
People from Bloomington, Minnesota
Rockford IceHogs (AHL) players
EC Red Bull Salzburg players
Nottingham Panthers players
EHC Lustenau players
Tri-City Storm players